Reach for Infinity is a 2014 science fiction anthology edited by Jonathan Strahan. In 2015, it was nominated for a Locus Award for Best Anthology, an Aurealis Award for Best Anthology and the Philip K. Dick Award.

Contents
 "Introduction" (essay) by Jonathan Strahan
 "Break My Fall" (novelette) by Greg Egan
 "The Dust Queen" (short story) by Aliette de Bodard
 "The Fifth Dragon" (novelette) by Ian McDonald
 "Kheldyu" (novelette) by Karl Schroeder
 "Report Concerning the Presence of Seahorses on Mars" (novelette) by Pat Cadigan
 "Hiraeth: A Tragedy in Four Acts" (short story) by Karen Lord
 "Amicae Aeternum" (short story) by Ellen Klages
 "Trademark Bugs: A Legal History" (short story) by Adam Roberts
 "Attitude" (novelette) by Linda Nagata
 "Invisible Planets" (short story) by Hannu Rajaniemi
 "Wilder Still, the Stars" (novelette) by Kathleen Ann Goonan
 "'The Entire Immense Superstructure': An Installation" (short story) by Ken MacLeod
 "In Babelsberg" (short story) by Alastair Reynolds
 "Hotshot" (novelette) by Peter Watts

Critical reception
In 2015, Reach for Infinity was nominated for a Locus Award for Best Anthology, an Aurealis Award for Best Anthology and the Philip K. Dick Award.

References

External links
 
 
 

2014 anthologies
Science fiction anthologies
Solaris Books books